Klaxon - mensario de arte moderna (Klaxon - modern art monthly) was a Brazilian avant-garde visual art and literary magazine, which ran from 15 May 1922 to January 1923. The publication was the main divulgator of the Brazilian Modernism, after the Week of Modern Art held in São Paulo.

Klaxon lasted for nine issues, and had among its collaborators Mário de Andrade, Oswald de Andrade, Di Cavalcanti, Tarsila do Amaral, Anita Malfatti, Menotti Del Picchia and other artists. Although not explicitally stated, Mario de Andrade was the magazine director and leader.

In 2013, the complete editions of Klaxon were collected in a book by the publishing house Cosac Naify and São Paulo’s ICCo (Instituto de Cultura Contemporânea).

References

External links
 Klaxon on Brazilian National Library archives.

1922 establishments in Brazil
1923 disestablishments in Brazil
Avant-garde magazines
Magazines published in Brazil
Monthly magazines published in Brazil
Defunct literary magazines
Defunct magazines published in Brazil
Magazines established in 1922
Magazines disestablished in 1923
Mass media in São Paulo
Portuguese-language magazines
Visual arts magazines